Design standards, reference standards and performance standards are familiar throughout business and industry, virtually for anything that is definable. Sustainable design, taken as reducing our impact on the earth and making things better at the same time, is in the process of becoming defined. Also, many well organized specific methodologies are used by different communities of people for a variety of purposes.

Design standards 
One of the better known is the Leadership in Energy and Environmental Design (LEED) green building rating system, which uses a diverse group of hard measures of environmental quality and impacts to define a holistic approach to sustainable building and assign ratings to individual projects.

Sustainable design is really just a more determined effort to consider the whole range of impacts on our environment in making any decision. A more complete design guide, guided more by whole project impact measures, is the model offered by the U.S. cooperating agencies in the "Whole Building Design Guide".

Green construction codes and standards are beginning to emerge on the national code stage. The standards go beyond energy standards such as ASHRAE 90.1 and the International Energy Conservation Code (IECC) to cover additional areas such as site sustainability, water efficiency, indoor environmental quality and materials and resources. The first is ASHRAE 189.1, Standard for the Design of High-Performance, Green Buildings Except Low-Rise Residential Buildings, published by ASHRAE in January 2010 in conjunction with the U.S. Green Building Council and the Illuminating Engineering Society. Standard 189.1 provides criteria by which a building can be judged as “green,” written in model code language that jurisdictions can use to develop a green building construction code.

Several organizations have developed their own ways of setting goals for energy reductions, such as Architecture 2030 and for qualifying performance toward them such as Cradle to Cradle.

Design methods 
Developing real methods for how to discover the design opportunities that would allow you to meet or exceed the standards was one of the objectives of the environmental design movement in architectural schools in the 1960s and 1970s, but though some of the issues introduced then are still an important part of the process, not much actually changed about the methods of design.  Now with the combination of many more interactive tools and much higher stakes in the outcome, and long gestating rethinking about natural systems in general, a dramatic new revolution in methodology seems inevitable.

BIM (building information modeling) allows designers to work with many remote consultants on the same data file that represents all the decisions being made by the team. The same file is available to the climate and energy and environmental impact analysis and cost analysis tools and consultants, ... and of course to the prospective contractors and the regulators. Along with this new integrated access to the model there in needed a new way to integrate the conversation of so many people, each with some interest in reviewing each other's comments on the progress with the central design model. That is likely to involve development of wiki tools for the process. One such very early implementation of a Wiki SD tool called "4Dsustainability" organizes the project design evolution around the general learning process of how you define the problem by exploring its environment, and following that through the project.

The main difference between sustainable design methods and conventional design is incorporating the entire environment of the project's stakeholders on the design team, essentially, requiring new ways to explore connections and for more people and perspectives to be taken into account. Other methods that recognize this requirement are the "AIA SDAT" (sustainable design assessment team) program and the "Scenarios for sustainability" process design tools.

References

Sustainable building
Sustainable architecture
Architecture
Low-energy building
Sustainable urban planning
Sustainable design